The Étoile Nord-Africaine or ENA (French for North African Star) was an early Algerian nationalist organization founded in 1926. It was dissolved first in 1929, then reorganised in 1933 but was later finally dissolved in 1937. It can be considered a forerunner of the Front de Libération Nationale (FLN), who fought France during the Algerian War of Independence (1954–62).

It was formed in 1926 by Nationalist politician Hadj-Ali Abdelkader and called for an uprising against French colonial rule and total independence. It had no armed wing and attempted to organize peacefully. The party maintained links with the Parti Communiste Français (PCF, the French Communist Party) until its dissolution in 1929. Later the Comintern, the PCF declared Algerian national independence premature. In 1925, Messali Hadj joined the ENA and in 1927 participated in the creation of the League Against Imperialism. The reorganisation of the 'Glorieuse ENA' in 1933 elected Messali Hadj President, Imache Amar Secretary General and Belkacem Radjef Treasurer. It also voted for an ambitious plan to lead Algeria to independence by peaceful means. The Étoile was dissolved by the French authorities in 1937 and Messali was imprisoned. It is considered by some the first modern Algerian political party.

In 1937, two months after its dissolution, the leaders of ENA, including Messali, founded the Parti du Peuple Algérien (PPA). This was subsequently dissolved in 1946 and was immediately followed by the creation of the Mouvement pour le Triomphe des Libertés Démocratiques, which later became increasingly militant. Messali distanced himself from the MTLD mainstream when it became involved in the Algerian War of Independence started by the FLN in November 1954.

References

External links 
 Program of the Étoile Nord-Africaine – by Messali Hadj, from www.marxists.org

Literature
Rachid Tlemcani, State and Revolution in Algeria, Boulder: Westview Press (1986).
Benyoucef Ben Khedda, "Les Origines du 1er Novembre 1954", Algiers: Editions Dahlab (1989).

1920s in Algeria
1926 establishments in Algeria
1929 disestablishments in Algeria
1930s in Algeria
1933 establishments in Algeria
1937 disestablishments in Algeria
Banned secessionist parties
Banned political parties in Algeria
Defunct political parties in France
Political parties disestablished in 1929
Political parties disestablished in 1937
Political parties established in 1926
Political parties established in 1933